Darlingtonia is an unincorporated community in Del Norte County, California. It is named after the Darlingtonia californica, common in the region.

References

External links

Unincorporated communities in California
Unincorporated communities in Del Norte County, California